Zisis Verros (Greek: Ζήσης Βέρρος, 16 August 1880 - 10 April 1985) was a notable Greek chieftain of the Macedonian Struggle.

Biography 
Verros was born in Avdella in 1880. He finished school in Avdella and graduated in the famous gymnasium of Tsotyli. He worked as a teacher in Avdella from 1889 to 1900. He then joined various Macedonian guerrilla groups, operating mainly as an agent, informant and driver, collaborating with the team of the famous Pavlos Melas. In 1905, his official armed action began, working with Loukas Kokkinos, Athanasios Brufas, Georgios Tsontos and Gr. Falerea. Shortly afterwards, he set up his own independent 35-member armed group, whose he was the leader. He participated in the victorious Battle of Orliaka against Ottoman troops, where a member of his band was killed. Then, with his group, he participated in the Battle of Ezeretsi (nowadays Petropoulakio) and then in the Operation of Paleor (nowadays Foufas) against Bulgarian Komitadjis.

In 1908, with the revolution of the Young Turks, he settled in the town of Grevena, but soon he was forced to flee as the new regime dissolved penalties against the Greeks and even those who were distinguished in the Macedonian Struggle.

In 1941 he was arrested by the German Nazis and remained in prison for 2 years. His family participated in the Greek Resistance, his son Kostas at ELAS and his four daughters at EAM and EPON. During the Civil war, Verros was persecuted and jailed for two years in Kozani.

He later was awarded by the Greek government with the Black Emblem of the Macedonian Struggle and by the Panhellenic Federation of Chieftains, with the honorary diploma.

He died at the age of 104 in 1985.

References 

Ένα ακόμα μικρό αφιέρωμα σε Μακεδονομάχους των Γρεβενών [A small tribute to the Macedonomachoi of Grevena] (in Greek)

1880 births
1985 deaths
Greek people of the Macedonian Struggle
Greek Resistance members
Prisoners and detainees of Greece
Greek Macedonians
Greek centenarians
Men centenarians
People from Avdella